Mary Edwards may refer to:
Mary Ann Edwards (1931–2021), American actress
Mary Edwards (1705–1743), William Hogarth's friend and patron
Mary Edwards Walker (1832–1919), American feminist, abolitionist, prohibitionist, surgeon, and Medal of Honor recipient
Mary Edwards Wertsch (born 1951), née Mary Edwards, author
Mary Edwards Bryan (1846–1913), née Mary Edwards, American journalist and author
Mary Youngblood (born 1958), née Mary Edwards, flutist
Mary Edwards (human computer) (c. 1750 – 1815), for the British Nautical Almanac
Mary Edwell-Burke (1894–1988), née Mary Edwards, Australian painter and carver
Mary Ellen Edwards (1838–1934), English artist and illustrator
Mary Stella Edwards (1893–1989), English painter
Mary Edwards (murder victim), murder victim and schoolteacher from Beaumont, Texas
Mary Ruth Edwards, candidate in the United States House of Representatives elections in Washington, 2010

See also
Edwards (surname)